Dionysius Kfoury, BS (5 December 1879 in Khonsarah, Syria – 11 March 1965) was a bishop of the Patriarchal Vicariate of Egypt and Sudan.

Life

Dionysius Kfoury was on August 6, 1904 ordained to the priesthood. On 9 December 1926, he was appointed Auxiliary Bishop of Antioch, and on the same day as the Titular Archbishop. On 20 June 1927 Kfoury was named Titular Archbishop of Tarsus of Greek Melkites. His ordination was performed by Melkite Patriarch of Antioch Cyril IX Moghabghab, and his co-consecrators were Basilio Cattan of Beirut and Byblos and Bishop Melezio Abou-Assaleh of Baalbek in Lebanon.

From 1932 to 1954 he was in the office of Patriarchal Vicar of Alexandria and successor of Anthony Farage. He was co-consecrator of Archbishop Elias Zoghby of Baalbek, which was also in the adjoining office Patriarchal Vicar of Alexandria.

References

External links
 http://www.catholic-hierarchy.org/bishop/bkfou.html
 http://www.gcatholic.org/dioceses/diocese/alex1.htm

1879 births
1965 deaths
Melkite Greek Catholic bishops
20th-century Eastern Catholic archbishops
20th-century Syrian people
19th-century Syrian people